Hughes Stadium, also known as The Den, is a multi-purpose stadium in Baltimore, Maryland. It is primarily used for football and is home of the Morgan State Bears. The stadium opened in 1937 and currently has a capacity of 10,001. Hughes Stadium features two separate seating structures behind both sidelines.

Gallery

See also
 List of NCAA Division I FCS football stadiums

References

External links
Virtual Tour

College football venues
Morgan State Bears football
American football venues in Maryland
Sports venues in Baltimore
Multi-purpose stadiums in the United States